Heart for Sale is the second studio album by Belgian singer-songwriter, Tom Dice. It was released on 3 May 2012. The album reached number 11 in Belgium. The album includes the singles "Utopia", "Out At Sea", "Drive Me to Paris" and "Let Me In".

Singles
"Utopia" was the first single to be released from the album on 28 February 2012, the single peaked to number 21 in Belgium. "Out At Sea" was the second single released from the album on 4 May 2012. "Drive Me to Paris" was the third single released from the album on 22 October 2012. "Let Me In" was the fourth single released from the album on 15 April 2013.

Track listing

Chart performance

Weekly charts

Release history

References

2012 albums
Tom Dice albums